The Huawei Nova 7 is an Android smartphone manufactured by Huawei. It spots a 6.53-inch display with a 20:9 aspect ratio.

Specifications

Display and camera 
Huawei Nova 7 has a 6.53-inch FHD+ display with a screen resolution of 1,080 x 2,400 pixels, the 403 PPI pixel density and 20:9 aspect ratio. This phone has a four camera 64 MP, f/1.8, 26mm (wide), 8 MP, f/2.4, (ultrawide), 8 MP, f/2.4, (telephoto), 2 MP, f/2.4, (macro) with PDAF and dual flash. The front camera is 16MP with wide angle.

Storage and configuration 
The phone comes with a non-expandable 128GB/256GB of internal storage (eMMC 5.1) and 8GB of RAM, This device is powered by Huawei's own HiSilicon Kirin 985chipset with specifications : Octa-core (1x2.58 GHz Cortex-A76 & 3x2.40 GHz Cortex-A76 & 4x1.84 GHz Cortex-A55). It also has an under-display fingerprint scanner for improved security.

Software 
The Nova 7 is launched with Android 10 and Huawei's EMUI 10. It has no Google Play Services preinstalled.

References 

Huawei smartphones
Android (operating system) devices
Mobile phones introduced in 2020